Stefano Pellini (born 6 August 1997) is an Italian professional footballer who plays as a midfielder for A.S.D. Varesina. Pellini made his professional debut during the 2016–17 Lega Pro season, for Tuttocuoio.

Early career

Pellini was born in the Lombard town of Cittiglio, and began his career in the youth teams of Legnano, Pro Patria and Varese. In 2011, he signed an amateur contract with Italian giants Juventus at the age of thirteen. Pellini progressed through the youth teams, eventually moving from the under-17 team to the under-19 team in 2014. He soon became a regular feature in the Primavera side under coach Fabio Grosso, playing in the Campionato Nazionale Primavera and Coppa Italia Primavera.

Tuttocuoio

In June 2016, Pellini was loaned to Lega Pro side Tuttocuoio for one year. He made his professional debut against Casertana on 31 July 2016, playing 120 minutes (a.e.t.) and scoring in an eventual 3–2 loss. His league debut came less than a month later, again starting in central midfield and playing the full game in a 2–2 draw away at Prato.

Serie D
On 18 September 2018 he joined San Marino in Serie D.

In August 2019, Pellini joined Milano City.

Eccellenza
In December 2019, Pellini moved to Eccellenza club A.S.D. Varesina.

References 

1997 births
People from Cittiglio
Living people
Italian footballers
Association football midfielders
A.C. Tuttocuoio 1957 San Miniato players
A.C. Cuneo 1905 players
A.S.D. Victor San Marino players
Serie C players
Serie D players
Eccellenza players
Milano City F.C. players
Sportspeople from the Province of Varese
Footballers from Lombardy